Francesco Guerra (born 10 November 1942) is an Italian mathematical physicist, whose main research contributions are in quantum field theory and spin glasses.

Career highlights
Francesco Guerra received his degree from the University of Naples in 1964. He was Professor of Theoretical Physics in Sapienza Università di Roma since 1979. In 1983 and 1984, he was Director of the Department of Mathematics and, from 1995 to 2001, Director of the Department of Physics.

Francesco Guerra was a plenary speaker at the European Congress of Mathematicians in 2004 and at the International Congress on Mathematical Physics in 2006.

Research
Francesco Guerra is known for his work on quantum field theory and his deep and original contributions to the mathematical theory of spin glasses. 
With Fabio Toninelli, he proved the existence of the thermodynamic limit of the free energy in the Sherrington–Kirkpatrick model; his discovery of the broken replica symmetry bound lead to the proof of the Parisi formula; and the Ghirlanda-Guerra identities have been shown to explain the emergence of ultrametricity in spin glasses.

Selected publications

Documentary

 "Nessuno mi troverà" — a 2015 documentary directed by Egidio Eronico.

References

External links
Francesco Guerra google scholar page
Francesco Guerra on IMDb

1942 births
Living people
20th-century Italian physicists
Mathematical physicists
University of Naples Federico II alumni
21st-century Italian physicists